William Augustus Blount Branch (February 26, 1847 in Tallahassee, Florida – November 18, 1910 in Washington, N.C.), son of Lawrence O’Bryan Branch and great-nephew of John Branch, was a Representative from North Carolina.

Career
Branch moved with his father to Raleigh, N.C., in 1852. He attended Lovejoy’s Academy in Raleigh, N.C., Bingham Military Academy near Mebane, N.C., the University of North Carolina at Chapel Hill, and Virginia Military Institute at Lexington. He joined the Confederate Army and served as a courier on the staff of Gen. R. F. Hoke. He later surrendered with Gen. Joseph E. Johnston’s army in 1865.

Branch studied law but never practiced. In 1867 he took charge of his landed estate near Washington, Beaufort County, N.C., and engaged in agricultural pursuits. He was elected as a Democrat to the Fifty-second and Fifty-third Congresses (March 4, 1891 – March 3, 1895) and was an unsuccessful candidate for re-election in 1894 to the Fifty-fourth Congress. He again engaged in agricultural pursuits on his estate. In 1896 Branch became a member of the State house of representatives. He died in Washington, N.C., November 18, 1910; interment in Oakdale Cemetery.

References

1847 births
1910 deaths
Democratic Party members of the United States House of Representatives from North Carolina
Democratic Party members of the North Carolina House of Representatives
19th-century American politicians
People from Tallahassee, Florida
People from Washington, North Carolina
People from Raleigh, North Carolina